The discography of heavy metal band Mastodon consists of eight studio albums, two live albums, three compilation albums, one video album, six extended plays, 27 singles and 23 music videos.

The band was formed in 2000 by guitarists Brent Hinds and Bill Kelliher, bassist and vocalist Troy Sanders, and drummer Brann Dailor, in Atlanta, Georgia. Mastodon released their debut extended play, Slick Leg in 2001, before signing with Relapse Records and releasing their second EP Lifesblood the same year, followed by the band's first studio album in 2002, Remission. After a tour promoting the album, Mastodon released their second studio album, Leviathan, in August 2004. In February 2006, Mastodon released two records—first, a compilation of their first two EPs, titled Call of the Mastodon, and shortly after, the video album, The Workhorse Chronicles. In the same year, Mastodon released their major label debut, Blood Mountain through Reprise Records, peaking at number 32 on the Billboard 200 chart. Mastodon then released Crack the Skye in 2009, The Hunter in 2011, Once More 'Round the Sun in 2014, Emperor of Sand in 2017 and Hushed and Grim in 2021, which entered the Billboard 200 at number 11, number 10, number 6, number 7 and number 20 respectively.

Albums

Studio albums

Live albums

Compilation albums

Demo albums

Extended plays

Singles

Guest appearances

Videos

Video albums

Music videos

Notes

References

External links
 
 
 

Heavy metal group discographies
Discographies of American artists